Anna Katarzyna Karaszewska (born March 10, 1970) is a Polish sociologist, economic and social activist and president of the board of the Congress of Women (2019–Present).

Early life and education 
Karaszewska graduated in sociology from the Faculty of Applied Social Sciences at the University of Warsaw, she continued her education in doctoral studies in the field of public and political promotion of women and graduated to gain both her MA and Ph.D. from Warsaw School of Economics. Furthermore, she gained an MA from the College of Europe, Bruges.

Career 
Karaszewska became faculty at the Warsaw School of Economics while lecturing at MA and postgraduate courses from 1999 to 2011. During 2009, she became one of the founding members of Poland's Women's Congress and later became its president.

Following this, Karaszewska co-created Poland's first national network of female entrepreneurs and a support system for further development among Polish women in 2012.

Additionally, during 2013-2014 Karaszewska went on to become the deputy general director at the confederation "Lewiatan”, an organisation working to create favourable conditions for the development of the economy and entrepreneurship in Poland, for which Karaszewska organised their activities in Brussels.

During 2019, Karaszewska went on to be nominated to join the Warsaw Council for Women by the major of Warsaw. The council focuses on building an equality and women's rights in addition to safety and support programs for women, vaccinations against HPV, and access to healthcare without the conscience clause.

Awards and recognition 
In 2005, Karaszewska was awarded the Silver Cross of Merit by the president of the Republic of Poland Aleksander Kwaśniewski. Additionally, she was a participant in the international mentoring program for women leaders, held by the US Department of state and Fortune magazine.

Personal life 
Karaszewska is Polish and speaks English and French fluently.

References

External links 

Living people
1970 births
Polish women
Feminists
Recipients of the Silver Cross of Merit (Poland)